Siah Kesh (also Romanized as Sīāh Kesh; also known as Sīākesh) is a village in Siahkalrud Rural District, Chaboksar District, Rudsar County, Gilan Province, Iran. At the 2006 census, its population was 92, in 22 families.

References 

Populated places in Rudsar County